Carmen Dalli (born 1959) is a New Zealand education academic specialising in early childhood education.

Dalli has a BA (Hons) from the University of Malta, a MEd from the University of Bristol and a PhD from Victoria University of Wellington She is currently a professor in the School of Education at Victoria University of Wellington.

Professor Dalli is chair of an independent ministerial advisory group set up to advise the Government of New Zealand on the development of its 10 Year Early Learning Strategic Plan.

Dalli is honorary consul for Malta in Wellington.

References

External links
 google scholar 
 linked-in
 institutional homepage

1959 births
New Zealand educational theorists
New Zealand women academics
Academic staff of the Victoria University of Wellington
Victoria University of Wellington alumni
University of Malta alumni
Honorary consuls
Living people
Early childhood education in New Zealand